Yuri Souza Almeida (born 7 May 1995), commonly known as Yuri Mamute, is a Brazilian professional footballer who plays as a striker for Sagamihara.

Club career
Mamute made his professional debut at Grêmio in 2011. In 2014, he was loaned to Botafogo. He returned to the "Tricolor Gaúcho" in early 2015 and became a starter in the team under Luiz Felipe Scolari, going on to play a bigger role in the tactics of the squad during Roger Machado's tenure. However, an injury to his ankle ligaments in July 2015 was a key factor keeping him out of action for about a month. Following his return from injury, he struggled to regain a starting position in the squad.
 
In January 2016, Panathinaikos and Grêmio confirmed a loan agreement was in place for Mamute who signed a half-year loan contract with the Greek club. The agreement included a fee of €100,000 for the first half season, rising to €200,000 if he were to play in the 2016–17 season. Panathinaikos secured the option to sign Mamute permanently either in the summer of 2016 for €4 million or at the end of the 18-month loan for €7 million. After three months with the club, Mamute was reportedly not deemed to be a suitable replacement for previous striker Nikolaos Karelis and rumoured to return to Grêmio at the end of the season.

In February 2017, Mamute went on trial with Kazakhstan Premier League side FC Aktobe, signing for the club on loan, on 18 February 2017.

Career statistics

Honours

National
Brazil U20
 Toulon Tournament: 2013

Individual
Toulon Tournament Golden Ball: 2013

References

External links
 Soccerway Profile

Yuri Mamute profile. Portal Oficial do Grêmio.

1995 births
Living people
Brazilian footballers
Brazil youth international footballers
Brazilian expatriate footballers
Association football forwards
Campeonato Brasileiro Série A players
Campeonato Brasileiro Série B players
Super League Greece players
Kazakhstan Premier League players
J3 League players
Grêmio Foot-Ball Porto Alegrense players
Botafogo de Futebol e Regatas players
Panathinaikos F.C. players
Clube Náutico Capibaribe players
FC Aktobe players
Esporte Clube Juventude players
Esporte Clube Água Santa players
Figueirense FC players
SC Sagamihara players
2015 South American Youth Football Championship players
Brazilian expatriate sportspeople in Greece
Brazilian expatriate sportspeople in Kazakhstan
Brazilian expatriate sportspeople in Japan
Expatriate footballers in Greece
Expatriate footballers in Kazakhstan
Expatriate footballers in Japan
Footballers from Porto Alegre